Jafar Shojouni was an Iranian Shia cleric and conservative politician who served a member of the Parliament of Iran from 1980 to 1984, representing Karaj. He was a member of Islamic Coalition Party’s Central Council, as well as the Combatant Clergy Association. He was also associated with Fada'iyan-e Islam.

References

1932 births
2016 deaths
Islamic Coalition Party politicians
Combatant Clergy Association politicians
Members of the 1st Islamic Consultative Assembly
Fada'iyan-e Islam members